James Ross was an American politician. He was the 29th mayor of Lancaster, Pennsylvania, from 1934 to 1938.

References

Mayors of Lancaster, Pennsylvania